The Kirk o' Shotts transmitting station is a broadcasting and telecommunications site at The Hirst which lies just outside the village of Salsburgh which is near the town of Shotts in North Lanarkshire central Scotland. (Kirk o' Shotts means 'Church of Shotts' and takes its name from nearby Kirk o' Shotts Parish Church and Kirk o' Shotts Primary School both located as you enter the nearby village of Salsburgh.)

History

Construction
It was built by BICC.

Transmission
The BBC 405-line television service in Scotland started from Kirk o' Shotts on 14 March 1952 using low power reserve transmitters (Marconi). Full service began on 17 August 1952 using the main high power transmitters (Vision EMI Type 5704, Sound STC Type CTS-12).  The station provided a service to a potential 4.1 million viewers and operated on Channel 3 (Vision 56.75 MHz, Sound 53.25 MHz) and transmissions were vertically polarised.

It subsequently became the main national FM transmitting station for the area, although that role is now filled by the nearby site at Black Hill.

Three DAB multiplexes are broadcast from the site: BBC (12B), Digital One (12A) and Switch Scotland (11D).

The station is owned by Arqiva.

Services available

Digital radio

Analogue television
VHF analogue television was transmitted from Kirk o' Shotts from its launch in 1952 until the nationwide shutdown of VHF signals in 1985.

See also
List of masts
List of tallest structures in the United Kingdom
Salsburgh

References

Further reading
Pawley, Edward,  BBC Engineering 1922–1972, BBC Publications 1972,

External links 
 Kirk o' Shotts mast and towers at www.lamont.me.uk
 Kirk o' Shotts at The Big Tower at www.thebigtower.com

Transmitter sites in Scotland
Buildings and structures in North Lanarkshire